"If I Loved You" is a show tune from the 1945 Rodgers and Hammerstein musical Carousel.

Background
In the show, the characters of Billy Bigelow and Julie Jordan sing this song as they hesitantly declare their love for one another, yet are too shy to express their true feelings.

The song was in turn inspired by lines of dialogue from Ferenc Molnár's original Liliom, the source material for the musical.

Carousel
The song was introduced by John Raitt as "Billy Bigelow" and Jan Clayton as "Julie" in the original Broadway production.

The song was performed in the 1956 film version Carousel by Gordon MacRae and Shirley Jones.

Other recordings
There were four hit versions of the song in 1945: Perry Como (#3), Frank Sinatra (#7), Bing Crosby (#8) and Harry James (#8).
In 1954, Roy Hamilton's recording went to #4 on Billboard's, Best Sellers in Stores chart.

Many artists have recorded the song over the years.

References

1945 songs
Songs with music by Richard Rodgers
Songs with lyrics by Oscar Hammerstein II
Shirley Jones songs
Barbra Streisand songs
Andy Williams songs
Songs from Rodgers and Hammerstein musicals